This was the year where Phillip McCallen of Honda achieved 4 wins in a week – a record not beaten until 2010.  He won all of the main races with Jim Moodie and Joey Dunlop picking up the smaller bike wins.

Dave Molyneux managed to hold off Rob Fisher to win both sidecar races.

Results
Race 1 – TT Formula One Race (6 laps – 226.38 miles)

Race 2 – Sidecar Race A (3 laps – 113.19miles)

Race 3 – Lightweight 250 TT Race (3 laps – 226.38 miles)

Race 4 – Sidecar Race B (3 laps – 113.19 miles)

Race 5 – Ultra Lightweight 125 TT(2 laps – ? miles)

Race 6 – Singles TT (2 laps – ? miles)

Race 7 – Junior TT 600cc (3 laps – ? miles)

Race 8 – Production TT

Race 9 – Senior TT Race (6 laps – 226.38 miles)

External links
1996 Isle of Man TT at iomtt.com

Isle of Man Tt
1996
Isle of Man TT
Isle